Diplomatic relations between the Netherlands and Iran (Persia) have existed since the 17th century. However, the relationship changed significantly after the Iranian Revolution.

Development

Beginning the relation in 17th century 
Political relations between Persia and the Netherlands started under Shah Abbas I. In 1626, the first Persian ambassador to Holland, Mousa Beig presented his credentials at the States-General of the Netherlands.

20th century 

In the 1960s and 1970s, the Persian and Dutch royal families made various state visits to each other's countries.

Relations with the Islamic Republic
The Netherlands has condemned Iran over its nuclear program.

In 2011, the Dutch Foreign Minister announced the suspension of official relations between the Netherlands and Iran, after the Dutch-Iranian Zahra Bahrami was executed in Iran.

On June 7, 2018, the Netherlands expelled two Iranian diplomats accredited to the Iranian embassy. In response, Iran summoned the Dutch ambassador in July 2018.

In January 2019, the government of the Netherlands accused Iran of having arranged the assassinations of two Dutch nationals of Iranian origin: Mohammad-Reza Kolahi in 2015, and Ahmad Molla Nissi in 2017. The incident caused outcry both in the Netherlands and internationally; EU responded with sanctions against Iranian intelligence. Iranian officials in turn accused the Netherlands of supporting the People's Mujahedin of Iran with its members in western Europe, who Mohammad-Reza Kolahi is believed to be a part of.

Trade
The Netherlands was formerly one of Iran's leading trade partners in Europe. At least 65 Dutch companies have economic ties with the Islamic Republic. In spite of economic sanctions imposed by the United States and the European Union, Shell, a UK-registered Anglo-Dutch oil company continues to buy billions in crude oil from Iran each year.

Political-economic conflicts 
In 1974, Persian students occupied the Persian Embassy in Wassenaar, out of protest against suppression and executions in Persia. Considering the 100 guilder fine too low a punishment for the students, the Persian government suspended all imports from Netherlands for a while.

In 2008 Alaeddin Boroujerdi, head of Iran's Majlis National Security and Foreign Policy Commission, warned the Netherlands not to air Geert Wilders' anti-Muslim film Fitna.

Iran has criticised the Netherlands for funding Radio Zamaneh. During the 2009 public unrest and demonstrations in Iran, Majid Ghahremani, Iranian ambassador to the Netherlands, accused the Dutch government of interfering in Iran's internal affairs. A Dutch foreign ministry spokeswoman said subsidies to the radio station would be continued, with the aim of improving the situation of human rights in Iran.

Cultural relations
In 2011 Iran established a series of cultural exhibits showing pictures featuring Iran's historical monuments and tourist attractions.

Diplomacy

Republic of Iran
The Hague (Embassy)

of the Netherlands
Tehran (Embassy)

See also
Foreign relations of Iran
Foreign relations of the Netherlands
Iran–EU relations
Iranians in the Netherlands
Anti-Iranian sentiment in the Netherlands

References

Literature 
 Herbert, Thomas. Travels in Persia 1627-1629. Edited by Sir Williams Foster, London, 1928.
 Perzië Blokkert Import Uit Ons Land. Nieuwsblad van het Noorden, 19-04-1974.
 Meilink, M. A. P. The earliest Relations between Persia and the Netherlands. "Persica" (Annual of the Dutch-Iranian Society), Vol. 6, 1974.
 Hotz, A. Journaal der reis van den gezant der O. I Compagnie, Joan Cunaus naar Perzië in 1651-1652 door Cornelis Speelman. Hist Gen., Utrecht, Amsterdam, 1980.

 
Netherlands
Iran